Jean Villepique ( }) is an American actress known for her roles in BoJack Horseman, A.P. Bio, and Up All Night. Villepique was previously a member of The Second City. Born in New Jersey, she earned a Bachelor of Arts degree in theatre from Northwestern University.

Raised in Bernardsville, New Jersey, Villepique graduated from Bernards High School in 1991.

Filmography

Film

Television

References 

Living people
American actresses
Actresses from New Jersey
Bernards High School alumni
Northwestern University alumni
People from Bernardsville, New Jersey
Year of birth missing (living people)
21st-century American women